Mowgli's Brothers is a 1976 television animated special directed by American animator Chuck Jones.  It is based on the first chapter of Rudyard Kipling's The Jungle Book.  The special was narrated by Roddy McDowall, who also performs the voices of all the male characters in the film. June Foray was the voice of Raksha, the Mother Wolf.  It originally aired on CBS on February 11, 1976.

The special was released on VHS, Betamax, and Laserdisc by Family Home Entertainment in 1985, and it was released on VHS again in 1999 and on DVD in 2002 and 2007 by Lionsgate. Jones also directed adaptations of two other The Jungle Book stories, "Rikki-Tikki-Tavi" and "The White Seal", in 1975.

Plot

Though largely a faithful adaptation of the story, there are some notable changes in Jones's version. Differences include expanded roles for Baloo and Tabaqui, and that Shere Khan is a white tiger without a lame leg.

References

External links

1976 television specials
1976 animated films
1970s American television specials
1970s American animated films
1970s animated television specials
CBS original programming
Animated television specials
Animated films about orphans
Animated films about bears
Animated films about wolves
Films about tigers
Television shows set in India
CBS television specials
Television shows directed by Chuck Jones
The Jungle Book films